"I Look to You" is a pop-soul song performed by American recording artist Whitney Houston, from her seventh studio album of the same name. It was released as a worldwide promotional single and as the first US single from the album on July 23, 2009 on US radio following highly favorable reviews at pre-release album listening parties.

The single is one of two songs written by R. Kelly which appear on the album and was produced by Emanuel Kiriakou, Tricky Stewart and Harvey Mason Jr. Following its preview on US radio the single was released fully for airplay on July 27, 2009.  On July 30, just one week after its premiere (and 3 days after its promotional release) the song reached number 19 on the Billboard Hot R&B/Hip-Hop Chart, becoming her 30th top 20 hit. The song has since become her highest charting single in the United States in nine years, charting at #70.

On February 18, 2012, R. Kelly (who wrote "I Look to You") performed the song at Houston's homegoing at New Hope Baptist Church in Newark, New Jersey.  The service was broadcast and streamed live to a worldwide audience.

Background
Initially Vibe magazine reported that another song titled "I Didn't Know My Own Strength" penned by Diane Warren and produced by David Foster would be released as the lead single.  However, on July 14, 21 and 23 Houston held 3 pre-release album listening parties in which 9 of the 11 songs where previewed, "Call You Tonight" was described as a possible lead single by mentor Clive Davis. Swizz Beatz producer of the song "Million Dollar Bill" (written by Alicia Keys) said that his record was definitely a potential comeback record and with critical acclaim at all three parties it was widely expected that the song would succeed the others as the lead single. However both Rap-Up and Houston's official website confirmed the title song would be the first US single whilst "Million Dollar Bill" was released as the worldwide lead single (second US single, almost simultaneously with first single). "I Look to You" was the second single from the album in the United Kingdom, where it was released on December 14, 2009.

Music video
The video for "I Look to You" premiered on September 10, 2009 on Whitney Houston's official website and on Entertainment Tonight.

The video, also directed by Melina Matsoukas, features the singer in front of a plain beige and gray backdrop with different angles of her. She is sitting on an applebox with a spotlight focused on her. Toward the end of the video, a shower of flowers are shown falling all around her. Houston is wearing a white dress in mood of the beige and grey background.  The significance of the number was her humbleness to the Lord.

Promotion
 Houston performed this song at Good Morning America on September 1, 2009. The show aired the following day.
 Houston sang "I Look To You" at German television Wetten, dass..? where she performed this song with great reviews.
 "I Look To You" was performed at 2nd annual BET Celebration of Gospel gala by Houston together with Kim Burrell and gospel choir. The performance was acclaimed as the best performance of the night.

Critical reception
Houston said that the powerful piano ballad sums up the album and was all she wanted to say at that stage of her life.  From the album parties Rolling Stone said that with the two tracks from R. Kelly (the chippy kiss-off "Salute" and the steely title track produced by Tricky Stewart, Emanuel Kiriakou and Harvey Mason Jr.) Houston seemed to be aiming for a younger audience and the radio.  Billboard magazine's Mark Surtherland wrote "The overall feel of the album was notably contemporary, while retaining Houston's trademark vocal flourishes. Clive Davis praised Houston by saying that on songs like "I Look to You" it is not difficult to say she is 'the premium balladeer of our time'.

Billboard'''s Monica Herrera gave the song a positive review, writing that Houston is "both vulnerable and in control". She adds that "the minimalist production, which features a lone, sullen piano and soft synths, exists purely to cushion Houston's moving vocal performance". Lastly, she stated that it "stands firmly in the tradition of her most emotive hits ("Greatest Love of All," "I Will Always Love You") and signals the long-awaited return of a true diva".

Cover versions
 The song was covered on the television show Glee during the second-season episode Grilled Cheesus. With Amber Riley on lead vocals, the song debuted and peaked at #74 on the Hot 100 during the week of October 23, 2010.
 On February 18, 2012, singer/songwriter R. Kelly (who wrote "I Look to You") performed the song at Houston's funeral at New Hope Baptist Church in Newark, New Jersey.  The service was broadcast and streamed live to a worldwide audience.
The song is covered by Selah on their fourth album, Hope of the Broken World, which was released in 2011.
The song was also covered by English singer-songwriter Joe McElderry featuring London Community Gospel Choir on his fourth studio album Here's What I Believe.
The song was covered on the NBC television show Zoey's Extraordinary Playlist, Season 2 Episode 10: Zoey's Extraordinary Girls' Night performed by Alex Newell. The episode aired on April 18, 2021.

Track listing

Digital download
"I Look to You" – 4:25

German double A-side single
"I Look to You" – 4:25
"Million Dollar Bill" – 3:24

UK digital single

"I Look to You" – 4:25
"I Look to You" (Giuseppe D. Club Mix) – 7:39
"I Look to You" (Johnny Vicious Warehouse Club Mix) – 8:52
"I Look to You" (Johnny Vicious Club Mix) – 9:08
"I Look to You" (Christian Dio Club Mix) – 7:53

UK digital remix EP
"I Look to You" (Johnny Vicious Warehouse Radio Mix) – 4:08	
"I Look to You" (Johnny Vicious Warehouse Club Mix) – 8:52
"I Look to You" (Johnny Vicious Warehouse Mixshow) – 5:50	
"I Look to You" (Johnny Vicious Radio Mix) – 3:52	
"I Look to You" (Johnny Vicious Mixshow) – 6:06
"I Look to You" (Johnny Vicious Club Mix) – 9:08
"I Look to You" (Christian Dio Radio Mix) – 4:01	
"I Look to You" (Christian Dio Mixshow) – 5:51	
"I Look to You" (Christian Dio Club Mix) – 7:53	
"I Look to You" (Giuseppe D. Radio Edit) – 3:47
"I Look to You" (Giuseppe D. Club Mix) – 7:39
"I Look to You" (Giuseppe D. Mixshow) – 5:52

Other versions
 7th Heaven Club Mix - 7:55
 7th Heaven Radio Edit – 4:10

Commercial performance
The song debuted at No. 86 on the Billboard Hot 100 and two weeks later peaked at No. 70. The song also did well on the Adult R&B Songs chart peaking at No. 2 the week of October 3, 2009. It spent six weeks on the Hot 100 and as of May 2012 had sold nearly 298,000 copies in the US. The song sold more than 550,000 copies worldwide and has been certified platinum by the RIAA, Houston's first single of the 2000s to do so.

Charts and certifications

Weekly charts

Year-end charts

Certifications

Release history

Accolades

Duet version with R. Kelly

The song was later re-recorded as a duet between Houston and R. Kelly and was released as a single on September 25, 2012, seven months after Houston's death. This version marks Houston's final single, and third posthumous release. One day before the release, a sneak peek of this version debuted on Ryan Seacrest's website. The duet version of the song was released from and to promote Houston's posthumous compilation album I Will Always Love You: The Best of Whitney Houston''. The song was released as the first and only single from the compilation by RCA Records.

Track listing
Digital download
"I Look to You" (Whitney Houston and R. Kelly) — 3:39

Chart performance

Release history

Accolades

External links
 I Look To You (Acharts)

References

2000s ballads
2009 singles
2012 singles
Whitney Houston songs
Songs written by R. Kelly
Song recordings produced by Tricky Stewart
Contemporary R&B ballads
Pop ballads
Soul ballads
Music videos directed by Melina Matsoukas
2009 songs
Arista Records singles
RCA Records singles
Gospel songs